Jerome Curtis Anderson (born September 2, 1973) was an American football cornerback who played one season for the Jacksonville Jaguars in 1997. He also played for the Albany Firebirds in 2000 and the B.C. Lions in 2001. He went to college at Pittsburgh.

References

Living people
1973 births
American football cornerbacks
American players of Canadian football
Pittsburgh Panthers football players
Jacksonville Jaguars players
Albany Firebirds players
BC Lions players
Players of American football from Virginia
Sportspeople from Lynchburg, Virginia
Players of Canadian football from Virginia